The advanced learner's dictionary is the most common type of monolingual learner's dictionary, that is, a dictionary written in one language only, for someone who is learning a foreign language. It differs from a bilingual or translation dictionary, a standard dictionary written for native speakers, or a children's dictionary.  Its definitions are usually built on a restricted defining vocabulary. "Advanced" usually refers learners with a proficiency level of B2 or above according to the Common European Framework. Basic learner's dictionaries also exist.

Although these advanced dictionaries have been produced for learners of several languages (including Chinese, Dutch, German, and Spanish), the majority are written for learners of English.

Printed 
The best-known advanced learner's dictionaries are:
Oxford Advanced Learner's Dictionary, first published in 1948.
Longman Dictionary of Contemporary English, first published in 1978.
Collins Cobuild English Dictionary, first published in 1987 and now published as Collins COBUILD Advanced Learner’s Dictionary.
Cambridge International Dictionary of English, first published in 1995 and now published as Cambridge Advanced Learner's Dictionary.
Macmillan English Dictionary for Advanced Learners, first published in 2002.
Merriam-Webster's Advanced Learner's English Dictionary, first published in 2008.

Macmillan recently announced that the dictionary would no longer be available in print. So there are four popular learner's dictionaries for British English that are available in print (Merriam-Webster's aims for American English).

Online
Online dictionary resources provide attractive support to advanced learners. The Open Dictionary of English is specifically designed to serve as a learner's dictionary. Visitors can register for free, adaptive tutoring, which seamlessly integrates with the dictionary.

See also
 Comparison of English dictionaries

Further reading

External links 
Crowdsourced
Open Dictionary of English
Wordnik
Wiktionary
Commercial
Cambridge Advanced Learner's Dictionary
Collins COBUILD Advanced Dictionary
Longman Dictionary of Contemporary English
Macmillan English Dictionary Online
Merriam-Webster's Advanced Learner's English Dictionary
Oxford Advanced Learner's Dictionary

English dictionaries
Dictionaries by type